The United Democratic Front (UDF) is a political party in Namibia. Justus ǁGaroëb founded the party in 1989 and led it until 2013. He was succeeded by Apius Auchab.

History
The United Democratic Front is a political party that is most widely supported by Damara people. Its roots are in the Damara Council, an administrative body for the Damaraland territory in South West Africa that in 1980 became a political party. The Damara Council in 1989 joined other parties in order to participate in the first democratic elections in Namibia. The result of the merger was the United Democratic Front (UDF).

The founding members of the UDF were Justus ǁGaroëb, leader of the Damara Council, and Reggie Diergaardt, leader of the Labour Party. On 20 July 1989 the Patriotic Unity Movement joined the UDF.

The UDF formed an alliance with a number of splinter parties prior to the 1989 election: 
 CANU-UDF, a wing of CANU, led by George Mutwa
 Workers Revolutionary Party (WRP), led by Attie Beukes, Erica Beukes, and Werner Henry Mamugwe
 Caprivi Alliance Party (CAP), led by Gabriel Siseho
 Original People's Party (OPP), led by Theophelus Soroseb
 Namibia National Independence Party (NNIP), led by Rudolf Ngondo
 Patriotic Unity Movement (PUM), led by Eric Biwa.

Electoral history

Presidential elections

National Assembly elections

1989
The UDF received 37,874 votes (5.65%) in the 1989 election, which elected members to the Constituent Assembly of Namibia. The Constituent Assembly elected the first President and wrote Namibia's constitution. From the UDF, President Justus ǁGaroëb, Reggie Diergaardt, Eric Biwa and Theophelus Soroseb were chosen for the assembly.

1992
The UDF won one seat in the 1992 elections for the National Council of Namibia.

1994
In 1994, electoral support for the party diminished in both relative and total support. The party received 13,309 total votes (2.72% of the national vote). Two UDF members were elected to the National Assembly (ǁGaroëb and Biwa).

1998
The party retained its single seat in the National Council in 1998.

1999
Following the 1999 parliamentary election, the UDF formed a coalition with the Democratic Turnhalle Alliance (DTA) so that the two parties could together be the official opposition despite the Congress of Democrats receiving the second highest number of votes.

2004
In the parliamentary election held on November 15 and 16, 2004, the party won 3.5% of popular votes and 3 out of 78 seats 1. More than half (16,081 of 29,336 total votes) of the party's electoral support came from Khomas Region, Kunene Region and Otjozondjupa Region, with the single largest total coming from Kunene. The party again retained its single seat in the National Council in 2004. The UDF MPs elected in 2004 were Justus ǁGaroëb, Gustaphine Tjombe and Michael Goreseb.

2009
In the November 2009 general election, Justus ǁGaroëb once again ran for election to Namibia's presidency with the UDF; he received 19,258 total votes, representing 2.37% of all votes and finished in fifth place. The party earned 2 seats in the National Assembly, down from 3 in 2004. The two seats went to party leader Justus ǁGaroëb and Simson Tjongarero.

References

External links
  Reprint of "Namibian Voters Deny Total Power to SWAPO" by Michael Johns, The Wall Street Journal, November 19, 1989.

 
Political parties in Namibia
Damara people
Political parties established in 1989
1989 establishments in South West Africa